In quantum mechanics, and especially quantum information processing, the entropy exchange of a quantum operation  acting on the density matrix  of a system  is defined as

Here,

and

where in the above equation  acts on  leaving  unchanged.

References
 

Quantum information science